Naypyidaw Central railway station, located in Naypyidaw, is one of the largest rail stations in Myanmar.

References

Naypyidaw
Railway stations in Myanmar
Buildings and structures in Naypyidaw